Madhavsinh Madhavrao Jagdale (born 25 April 1914 in Baroda, Gujarat - died 13 January 1990 in Bhopal, Madhya Pradesh) was an Indian cricketer and a former member of the Selection Committee. He played 64 first-class matches for Baroda cricket team, Central India cricket team, Holkar cricket team. He scored 2763	with two centuries and 18 half-centuries. He also took 72 wickets with his bowling.

His sons Sanjay Jagdale and Ashok Jagdale played cricket for Madhya Pradesh cricket team. His son Sanjay is former Indian national team selector. Sanjay and Madhavsinh is only father-son pair that represent Indian cricket selectors but never  represented India cricket team in International Cricket.

References

External links
 
 

1914 births
1990 deaths
Indian cricketers
Holkar cricketers
Central India cricketers
Baroda cricketers
Indian cricket administrators
India national cricket team selectors
Cricketers from Indore